The simple-station De La Sabana is part of the TransMilenio mass-transit system of Bogotá, Colombia, opened in the year 2000.

Location

The station is located close to downtown Bogotá, close to the main train station, De La Sabana, but more specifically on the Troncal Calle 13 between Carreras 16 and 17.

History

The station was opened in 2003 as part of the opening of Main Line Calle 13 from this station to Puente Aranda.

Station services

Old trunk services

Main line service

Feeder routes

This station does not have connections to feeder routes.

Inter-city service

This station does not have inter-city service.

See also
Bogotá
TransMilenio
List of TransMilenio Stations

External links
TransMilenio

TransMilenio